The North West Provincial Legislature is the primary legislative body of the South African province of North West. It is unicameral in its composition, and elects the premier and the provincial cabinet from among the members of the leading party or coalition in the parliament.

Powers
The North West Provincial Legislature elects the Premier of North West, the head of the province's executive.  The legislature, by passing a motion of no confidence, can force the Premier to resign. The legislature may pass a motion of no confidence to compel the Premier to reconfigure the Executive Council, even though the Executive Council members are selected by the Premier. The legislature also appoints North West's delegates to the National Council of Provinces, allocating delegates to parties in proportion to the number of seats each party holds in the legislature.

The legislature has the power to pass legislation in multiple fields, matters such as health, education (except universities), agriculture, housing, environmental protection, and development planning, all mentioned in the national constitution; in some fields the legislative power is shared with the national parliament, while in others it is reserved to the province alone.

The legislature oversees the administration of the North West provincial government, and the Premier and the members of the Executive Council are required to report to the legislature on the performance of their responsibilities. The legislature also manages the financial affairs of the provincial government by way of the appropriation bills which determine the provincial budget.

Election

The Legislature, like all those in South Africa, is chosen via party list proportional representation, for terms of five years, though may be dissolved earlier under certain conditions.  The most recent election was held on 8 May 2019. The following table summarises the results.

The following table shows the composition of the provincial parliament after past elections.

Officers

The Speaker of the Legislature is Sussana Dantjie. The Deputy Speaker is Viola Motsumi. They are both members of the African National Congress.

Members

References

External links
 Official website

Provincial legislatures of South Africa
Unicameral legislatures